The Battle of Cingoli was fought in 1250 between the forces of the Holy Roman Empire and the armies of the Guelphs and the Papal States, the area being so notable due to its nickname as "The Balcony of Marche". The Imperial forces inflicted a crushing defeat on the Pope's factions. After the battle, Frederick II, Holy Roman Emperor was smitten with dysentery, and Pope Innocent IV declared the illness to be an act of God. This was most probably due to the Emperor's excommunication; a common threat and practice for subduing overconfident Catholic leadership.

Cingoli 1250
Cingoli 1250
Wars of the Guelphs and Ghibellines
1250 in Europe
Conflicts in 1250
Frederick II, Holy Roman Emperor